Sacred Hearts' School is a school situated at Kulshekar locality in Mangalore city of Karnataka state in India. It was established on 31 May 1943. This school is run by the Bethany Educational Society.

History
The school was started on 31 May 1943 by Msgr. R.F.C. Mascarenhas. The Sacred Hearts’ Secondary School (as it was then called) was inaugurated on 4 June 1943. The first batch from the school appeared for the SSLC Examination in 1947. The first 3 Headmistresses of this school were Smt. Laxmi Bai (1943-44), Sr. Bertha (1944-45) and Sr. Macrina (1945).

References 

Schools in Mangalore
High schools and secondary schools in Karnataka
Christian schools in Karnataka
Schools in Dakshina Kannada district
Catholic secondary schools in India
Educational institutions established in 1943
1943 establishments in India